William Hedley Richardson Bunbury (born 7 October 1940, in Glastonbury, England), known as Bill Bunbury, is a former radio broadcaster and producer for the Australian Broadcasting Corporation, and an accomplished historian and writer.

Early life
Bunbury was born in Glastonbury, England in 1940, to an Australian father and an English mother. He graduated with an honours degree from the University of Durham in 1963, then decided to visit his father's homeland, Australia. He worked as a farmhand on his cousin's farm in Broomehill for 2 months before moving to Perth, where he taught English at Guildford Grammar School. A visit to the school by an ABC television crew introduced Bunbury to ABC producer Roger Penny. Penny recommended Bill to apply for an ABC position and  he joined the ABC'S Education in May 1969.

Career
Bunbury's first couple of years at the ABC consisted of radio work. He moved to television shortly afterwards to present a children's program called Here in the West. Later, while making a film series about significant communities, he came across the experience of  Group Settlers in Denmark, Western Australia in the 1920s. Unable to get funds for a TV production he recorded a 30 minute radio documentary THEY SAID YOU'D OWN YOUR OWN FARM  Its unexpected popularity prompted Bunbury to 
move full time to radio, travelling around Western Australia recording  series called LIVING HISTORY. 

In 1985, historian and broadcaster Tim Bowden founded  the ABC's social history unit, and invited Bill to join the unit.   He had already produced a Background Briefing on the death of John Pat in the Pilbara  and 
then produced Hindsight', Verbatim, Street Stories and Encounter. He retired from the ABC in 2007. Bunbury said, "I wanted to go while I was still doing good work. I think I've quit while I was, hopefully, still winning races. I think maybe some [journalists] retire too early. Perhaps some go on [working] too long. You try to pick the right time."

He has subsequently worked with Community Arts WA, producing radio features which assist Aboriginal communities to tell their own stories and has also presented VoicePrints for the Perth International Arts Festival'
Bunbury's documentary series covered such topics as Cyclone Tracy, Australia's involvement in the Vietnam War, and the granting of equal wages to Aboriginal stockmen in 1966. His work had a strong focus on Indigenous Australian history. Bunbury won several awards for his radio programmes and series, including the NSW Premier's Media Prize in 1996 for his six part series UNFINISHED BUSINESS,- RECONCILIATION & THE REPUBLIC, the New York Radio Festival Gold medal for Best History Documentary,   "Timber for Gold", Gold Mining and Timber ] in Kalgoorlie, and the  UN Australia Peace Prize for "The War Rages On",  Australians in Vietnam.

His interest in oral history and recording of people's memories has created a vast resource in the Western Australian state library, Battye Library, of recorded interviews with people from various documentaries and programmes. Journalist Andre Malan has described this as Bunbury's legacy, "a priceless archive of the State's rich oral history that would otherwise have been lost forever".

Bunbury has published extensively with the Fremantle Press, and is currently Adjunct Professor of History and Media at Murdoch University where he was also awarded an Honorary Doctorate in Literature in 2008 for services to broadcasting and history.

In 2017 Bill Bunbury was awarded an Order of Australia for his services to broadcasting  and Aboriginal communities.

Personal life
Bunbury and his wife, Jenny now live in Margaret River. They have two daughters, Alison and Kate and two grandsons, Sam and Jack. On 26 January 2017, Australia Day, Bill Bunbury was awarded the Order Of Australia for services to the broadcast media and the Indigenous people of Australia.

Published works
 Bunbury, Bill & Bunbury, Jenny (2020) Many  Maps, Charting Two Cultures:First Nations and Europeans in Western Australia, Crawley, WA,  UWA Publishing, ISBN 978-1-76080-141-0
Bunbury, Bill  (2015). INVISIBLE COUNTRY South-West Australia: Understanding a Landscape Crawley, WA : UWA Press 
Bunbury, Bill & Bunbury, Jenny, (2015), Sound of the Cockies, Perenjori: One hundred Years of Stories, Shire of Perenjori/ Fremantle Press ISBN 9780646936918
 Bunbury, Bill. (2010). Till the stream runs dry. A history of hydrography in Western Australia. Department of Water WA     
 Bunbury, Bill. (2006). Caught in time: talking Australian history. Fremantle, WA: Fremantle Arts Centre Press.  
 Bunbury, Bill. (2002). It's not the money it's the land: Aboriginal stockmen and the equal wages case / talking history with Bill Bunbury. North Fremantle, WA: Fremantle Arts Centre Press. 
 Bunbury, Bill. (2002). Timber for gold: life on the Goldfields woodlines / talking history with Bill Bunbury. North Fremantle, WA : Fremantle Arts Centre Press. 
 Bunbury, Bill. (1998). Unfinished business: reconciliation, the republic and the constitution Sydney: ABC Books. 
 Bunbury, Bill. (1995). Rabbits & spaghetti: captives and comrades, Australians, Italians and the war, 1939-1945 / talking history with Bill Bunbury. Fremantle, WA: Fremantle Arts Centre Press. 
 Bunbury, Bill. (1994). Cyclone Tracy: picking up the pieces / talking history with Bill Bunbury. South Fremantle, WA: Fremantle Arts Centre Press. 
 Bunbury, Bill. (1993). Rag, sticks & wire: Australians taking to the air  Sydney: ABC Books. 
 Bunbury, Bill. (1993). Reading labels on jam tins: living through difficult times South Fremantle, WA: Fremantle Arts Centre Press. 
 Bowden, Ros, & Bunbury, Bill. (1990) Being Aboriginal : comments, observations and stories from Aboriginal Australians / from the ABC Radio programs by Ros Bowden and Bill Bunbury''. Sydney: ABC Enterprises.

Notes

Living people
1940 births
People from Glastonbury
Australian historians
ABC radio (Australia) journalists and presenters
Writers from Perth, Western Australia
Alumni of Hatfield College, Durham
British emigrants to Australia